Aitit is a town located in Tyre District, South Lebanon, north of  Qana. Aitit's residents are primarily Shiite Muslim.

History
In the early 1860s Ernest Renan noted: "Its antiquities are a stone with three circles, two with rays, in which are crosses (not of great age), a grotto, and beside it a good sarcophagus lid serving to support a press. Near Aitit is a rectangular cemetery, well preserved".

In 1881, the PEF's Survey of Western Palestine (SWP)  described it as "A village, built of stone, containing about 450 Metawileh, situated on hill-top, surrounded by olives and arable cultivation; water supplied from cisterns and a spring near."

They further noted: "There are traces at this village of ancient remains. It is said by the natives that there was once a church here. There are broken pillars scattered about, stone lintels, three caves, and three olive-presses, with cisterns."
Aitit is mainly occupied by the family of the Mohsens, who have the majority of the village.

Attacks on Aitit
Due to it being close to Israel many attacks have been made against Aitit. Throughout Aitit many houses have bullet holes engraved in the bricks and some buildings have still not been revived. Most of these incidents were due to the 2006 Lebanon War. Within that war 3 people died.

References

Bibliography

External links
Survey of Western Palestine, Map 2:   IAA, Wikimedia commons
 Aaytit, Localiban

Populated places in Tyre District
Shia Muslim communities in Lebanon